Mount Ayres is a prominent mountain,  high, lying  south of the west end of the Finger Ridges in the Cook Mountains of Antarctica. It was climbed in December 1957 by the Darwin Glacier Party of the Commonwealth Trans-Antarctic Expedition (1956–58), and named for H.H. Ayres, one of the two men comprising the Darwin Glacier Party.

See also
Finn Spur
Gjelsvik Spur

References
 

Mountains of Oates Land